Vaskivesi – Visuvesi is a medium-sized lake in Finland. It is situated in the municipality of Virrat in the Pirkanmaa region in western Finland. The lake is part of the Kokemäenjoki basin. The lake drains into the lake Tarjanne in the south.

See also
List of lakes in Finland

References

Kokemäenjoki basin
Landforms of Pirkanmaa
Lakes of Virrat